The 1972 United States presidential election in Arkansas took place on November 7, 1972, as part of the 1972 United States presidential election. State voters chose six representatives, or electors, to the Electoral College, who voted for president and vice president.

Arkansas was won by incumbent President Richard Nixon (R–California), with 68.82% of the popular vote, against George McGovern (D–South Dakota), with 30.71% of the popular vote. John G. Schmitz was the only other candidate on the ballot, and, as the candidate for the American Independent Party, he received just over three thousand votes. 

In a state that would reflect McGovern's national results, the Democratic nominee did not win a single county in Arkansas. This marked the first time that Arkansas had voted Republican in a presidential election since Ulysses S. Grant carried the state in 1872, and made Nixon only the second Republican (after Grant) to ever carry the state. , this remains the strongest ever Republican presidential performance in Arkansas, the only time that a Republican has swept every county in the state, and the last presidential election in which the Republican carried Phillips County, Jefferson County, Lee County, Chicot County, and Desha County in a presidential election.

Results

Results by county

See also
 United States presidential elections in Arkansas

References

Arkansas
1972
1972 Arkansas elections